The  or TNM is an art museum in Ueno Park in the Taitō ward of Tokyo, Japan. It is one of the four museums operated by the National Institutes for Cultural Heritage (:ja:国立文化財機構), is considered the oldest national museum in Japan, is the largest art museum in Japan, and is one of the largest art museums in the world. The museum collects, preserves, and displays a comprehensive collection of artwork and cultural objects from Asia, with a focus on ancient and medieval Japanese art and Asian art along the Silk Road. There is also a large collection of Greco-Buddhist art. The museum holds over 110,000 Cultural Properties, including 89 National Treasures of Japan, 319 Horyuji Treasures, and 644 Important Cultural Properties. As of 2022, there were 902 arts and crafts designated national treasures by the Japanese government, meaning the Tokyo National Museum has about 10% of the art and crafts designated national treasures of Japan. In addition, the museum houses over 3000 Cultural Properties deposited by individuals and organizations, including 55 national treasures and 253 important cultural properties (as of March 2019). The museum also conducts research and organizes educational events related to its collection.

The facilities consist of the Honkan, holding the Japanese Gallery; the Heiseikan and Hyokeikan, holding special exhibitions; the Toyokan, holding the Asian Gallery; the Gallery of Horyuji Treasures, holding important relics originally preserved at Nara's Horyu Temple; the Kuroda Memorial Hall, holding a collection of works by Kuroda Seiki; and the Research and Information Center. There are restaurants and shops within the museum's premises, as well as outdoor exhibitions (including the Kuromon) and a garden where visitors can enjoy seasonal views.

The Tokyo National Museum is one of four museums operated by the National Institutes for Cultural Heritage; Kyoto National Museum, Nara National Museum, and Kyushu National Museum are museums other than Tokyo. The Tokyo National Museum is a representative museum that comprehensively exhibits Japanese cultural assets, but other national museums are more complete in specific areas, such as cultural assets from the Meiji era in the 1800s to the present. The Independent Administrative Institution National Museum of Art, operates seven museums specializing in specific fields, including those focusing on modern art and Japanese crafts and those focusing on Western art. Two museums managed by the National Institutes for the Humanities focus on folklore. The Museum of the Imperial Collections, managed by the Imperial Household Agency, focuses on cultural assets donated to the nation by Japanese imperial family.

Names
The museum went through several name changes. The original 1872 exhibition was known as the "Museum of the Ministry of Education". The compound in Uchiyamashita-chō was initially known simply as "the Museum" (Hakubutsukan) before becoming the "Sixth Bureau of the Home Ministry", after which it was again known as the Museum and then the "Museum of the Museum Bureau". As other museums opened, this changed to the more specific Tokyo Imperial Household Museum in 1900. Following the government reforms imposed after World War II, it was renamed the "National Museum" in 1947 and the "Tokyo National Museum" in 2001. The museum is also sometimes known as the "Ueno Museum".

History

Yushima Seido Exhibition
The Tokyo National Museum is the oldest national museum in Japan. The items' authenticity had been ascertained by the recent Jinshin Survey, which catalogued and verified various imperial, noble, and temple holdings around the country. Directed by Shigenobu Okuma, Tsunetami Sano, and others, the 1872 exhibition expanded on an 1871 exhibit at the Tokyo Kaisei School (today the University of Tokyo) in order to prepare for an international exhibition at the 1873 Vienna World's Fair celebrating F manufactures and boost exports; 24 engineers were also sent with the delegation to study cutting-edge Western engineering at the fair for use in Japanese industry. The most important products of each province were listed and two specimens of each were collected, one for display in Vienna and the other for preservation and display at a new museum. The 1872 exhibition, held at the Taiseiden Hall of the former Confucian temple at Yushima Seido in the Shoheizaka neighborhood, was open daily 9 am to 4 pm and ultimately admitted about 150,000 people. The 1873 exhibition in Vienna, apart from the collection of regional objects, also included a full Japanese garden with shrine, a model of the former pagoda at Tokyo's imperial temple, the female golden shachi from Nagoya Castle, and a papier-maché copy of the Kamakura Buddha. The next year, Sano compiled a report on the fair in 96 volumes divided into 16 parts. Gottfried Wagener, a German scientist then working in Tokyo, wrote its reports on "The Art Museum in Respect to Arts and Various Crafts" and "The Establishment of the Tokyo Museum", arguing strongly for the creation of a museum on western lines in the Japanese capital.

Uchiyamashita museum
While the Vienna World Fair was going on, the locally-held objects were organized by the Exposition Bureau into a temporary display at a compound in Uchiyamashita-chō (now 1-Chome in Uchisaiwai-chō), immediately southeast of the Imperial Palace, in March 1873. It opened on 15 April and was open to the public for the next 3½ months, after which it opened on the days in each month ending with the numbers 1 or 6. A special exhibition in 1874 focused on new technology in medicine, chemistry, and physics. On 30 March 1875, the museum was moved under the Home Ministry. By this time, it included seven buildingsincluding a greenhousewith displays covering Japanese antiques, agriculture, and the natural sciences; the grounds had an area for livestock and a room for bears. The museum continued to be connected to industry and was closely involved with the national industrial exhibitions held in Ueno Park in 1877, 1881, and 1890.

Ueno museum

Ueno Park was founded in 1873 on land that had been held by the metropolitan government since the destruction of most of the Kaneiji Temple during the Boshin War that established the Meiji Restoration, partially following the example set by the American government at Yellowstone the preceding year. Hisanari Machida, the museum's first director, had advocated the use of the spacious park for a wide-ranging museum as early as 1873 but parts of it were used for the military and education ministries until 1875, when the Home Ministry acquired complete control. The museum's early conception was based on the South Kensington Museum (now the Victoria & Albert Museum) in London, but important changes were made. The museum collections were divided into the eight categories of fine arts, nature, agriculture & forestry, history, law, education, industry, and land & sea. The ministry gave the entire park to the museum in January 1876 but its facilities there weren't completed until 1881, when the original Honkan was completed in time for the Second National Industrial Exhibition; the smaller brick building used by the first National Industrial Exhibition in 1877 was incorporated into this as a wing. In April 1881, the museum was moved from the Home Ministry to the Ministry of Agriculture and Trade. It began construction on the associated zoo and added the Asakusa Bunko collection to the museum as its book department.

A ceremony attended by Emperor Meiji opened the museum and zoo on 20 March 1882; the library was reopened on September 30. The facilities were open to the public every day except Mondays and two days around the New Year. In 1888 or 1889, the imperial household took over ownership of the museum, focusing its operations on cultural and scientific pursuits and ending its direct involvement with trade and industry. The original Honkan was severely damaged in the Great Kanto earthquake of 1923, and exhibits were moved to the undamaged Hyokeikan. The structure having originally been promoted as having "solidity... matched by no other" in Japan, its collapse led to disillusionment with the architecture and style it represented.

Upon the marriage of Hirohito in 1924, the entire Ueno Parkalong with the museum and the zoowere returned to the Tokyo Municipal Government as a present. While the main building's reconstruction was being discussed, the natural science collections were removed from the museum in 1925 to form the separate Tokyo Museum of the Ministry of Education (the present-day National Science Museum). An Imperial Museum Innovation Promotion Committee was assembled the next year following the ascension of Hirohito as emperor, which ultimately decided to replace the former building. In 1931, they held a design contest and selected the Imperial-Crown plan from Jin Watanabe.

The present Honkan was opened to the public in 1938, having reorganized its collection to dissolve the history department and classify its holdings as art. In November 1940, the Shosoin were publicly displayed for the first time to celebrate the supposed 2600th anniversary of the ascension of the first emperor of Japan. 400,000 came to see them during the 20-day exhibit.

The museum saw attendance begin to fall after 1925; it was closed in 1945 during the final phases of the Second World War. It was placed under the Ministry of Education in 1947, the Independent Administrative Institution National Museum in 2001 (merging its administration with the Kyoto, Nara, andin 2005Kyushu National Museums), and the Independent Administrative Institution National Institutes for Cultural Heritage in 2007 (merging the IAINM's administration with the national institutes for cultural preservation in Tokyo and Nara).

From October 18, 2022 to December 11, the Tokyo National Museum celebrated its 150 year anniversary by displaying all of its 89 national treasures in a single exhibition for the first time.

Facilities

Honkan (Japanese Gallery)

The  houses the museum's main display of Japanese art from prehistory to the late 19th century. It is designed to be fire- and earthquake-resistant.

The Honkan is located on the former site of the main hall of the Kaneiji Temple, which was destroyed during the Boshin War. The first Honkan incorporated a brick structure used as the main hall for the first National Industrial Exhibition in 1877. Construction on its replacement began the next year, following plans drawn up by the English architect Josiah Conder. The two-story brick hall incorporated Anglo-Indian architecture, with two green onion domes surmounting the towers flanking the main entrance. It was completed in 1881. This building was ruined by the Great Kanto earthquake of 1923.

It was replaced by Jin Watanabe's reinforced-concrete structure in the Imperial Crown Style, with a neoclassical base and Japanese roof. It was completed from 1932 to 1938 at a cost of 7 million yen. It opened on 10 November 1938 with a ceremony attended by Emperor Hirohito. The building was designated an Important Cultural Property of Japan in 2001.

The rooms are ordered beginning with the SE corner of the second floor, passing clockwise around the second and first floor, and ending with the SW corner of the first floor.

The basement holds another educational space.

Heiseikan

The  hosts regular special exhibitions in the four large galleries on its second floor; the first floor includes the Japanese Archaeology Gallery, another space for temporary exhibits, a spacious lounge and café, an auditorium, and lecture and orientation rooms. The first floor also holds the gallery of major donors to the museum.

The Heiseikan was first opened in 1999. Its name reflects the regnal era of its creation, the rule of Emperor Akihito, which lasted from 1989 to 2019. The building was erected to commemorate the wedding of Crown Prince Hiro to Masako Okawa (now Emperor Naruhito and Empress Masako) on 9 June 1993.

The Japanese Archaeology Gallery introduces the use of archaeology to date excavated objects and includes a display of various finds from Japanese sites, including Jomon linear appliqué pottery, some of the oldest pottery in the world.

Toyokan (Asian Gallery)

The  displays the museum's collections of Chinese, Korean, Indian, and Southeast and Central Asian art. It also includes a display of Egyptian objects. There is a theater in its basement and a dinner to its side.

The Toyokan was designed by Yoshirō Taniguchi, opened in 1968, refurbished in the early 2010s, and reopened in January 2013. It is three stories tall but employs its basement and a spiral arrangement of mezzanines and stairs to spread its collection over six floors.

Horyuji Homotsukan (Gallery of Horyuji Treasures)

The  is a two-story building housing the museum's collection of relics from the Horyu Temple in Nara. The 319 items were given to the Imperial Household by the temple in 1878, then placed at the National Museum for safekeeping and preservation.

The building was designed by Yoshio Taniguchi and opened in 1999.

A mezzanine between the two floors holds a Reference Room with a digital archive of the treasures, allowing visitors to view the entire collection with explanations in Japanese, Korean, Chinese, English, French, and German. There is a restaurant on the first floor.

Hyokeikan

The  is closed to the public except during special exhibitions.

The Hyokeikan was first opened in 1909. Its name reflects its construction in honor of the wedding of Crown Prince Yoshihito and Sadako Kujo (later Emperor Taisho and Empress Teimei) on 10 May 1900. As an example of the Western-influenced architecture of the late Meiji Era, it was designated an Important Cultural Property in 1978.

Kuroda Kinenkan (Kuroda Memorial Hall)

The  holds a collection of works by the important Western-style (yōga) artist Kuroda Seiki. Its collection presently comprises 126 oil paintings and 170 drawings, as well as sketchbooks, letters, &c. Located northwest of the main museum compound, it has free admission and separate hours of operation (9:30 AM5:00 PM, with the last admission at 4:30).

Designed by Okada Shinichirō, the hall was built in 1928 as part of Kuroda's bequest to use part of his fortune "to fund projects to promote art". In 1930, it became the headquarters of the Art Research Institute, which became the Tokyo Research Institute for Cultural Properties. The TRICP moved in 2000, with the Kuroda Memorial Hall reopening as a public gallery the next year. In 2007, its administration was transferred to the Tokyo National Museum, which renovated it before reopening it on 2 January 2015. Admission was originally restricted to two-week periods in January, Spring, and Autumn but it is presently open whenever the main museum is.

The exhibition on the second floor consists of 4 rooms: the Kuroda Memorial Room, the Reading Room, the Audiovisual Room, and the Collection Highlights Gallery. There is also a cafe on the first and second floors.

Shiryokan (Research and Information Center)
The  holds books, magazines, images, and other documents relating to history, archaeology, and the fine and applied arts in Japan, Asia, and the Middle East.

The Research and Information Center was opened in 1984. The floor open to the public includes two reading rooms, an exhibition area, and counters for requesting items held in the archives on the other floors. Free access is available without admission to the rest of the museum through the compound's west gate.

Access
        Ueno Station (with JR East and Tokyo Metro)
   Uguisudani Station (with JR East)
  Keisei Ueno Station (with Keisei Electric Railway)
  Nezu Station (with Tokyo Metro)

See also
 Lists of National Treasures and Horyuji Treasures at the Tokyo National Museum
 Kuromon ("Black Gate"), one of two surviving feudal main gates in Tokyo
 Kyoto, Kyushu, and Nara National Museums
 Japanese art
 Greco-Buddhist art
 Silk Road
 Machida Hisanari
 Wuzhun Shifan
 List of National Treasures of Japan

Notes

References

Citations

References
 . 
 .
 .

External links
 . 
 , including images of the National Museum through the 20th century.
Virtual tour of the Tokyo National Museum provided by Google Arts & Culture